This is a list of yearly Kansas Collegiate Athletic Conference football standings.

Kansas Collegiate Athletic Conference standings

NAIA (1956–1969)

NAIA Division II (1970–1996)

References

Kansas Collegiate Athletic Conference
Standings